Hamdi Labidi (born 9 June 2002) is a Tunisian professional football player who plays for Club Africain.

Club career 
Hamdi Labidi made his professional debut for Club Africain on the 12 December 2020, starting as center forward in the Ligue Pro 1 against AS Rejiche.

International career 
With Tunisia U20, Labidi reached the U20 CAN semifinals in 2021.

References

External links

2002 births
Living people
Tunisian footballers
Tunisia youth international footballers
Association football forwards
Club Africain players
Tunisian Ligue Professionnelle 1 players